Spirit Love Show is an American reality television miniseries created by Shin Koyamada from The Last Samurai, Nia Lyte and Claudia Hallowell in 2013. The show was distributed by the Spirit Show Network and directed by Jay Lee from Sony Pictures' Zombie Strippers. The hosts of the show are Nia Lyte, a TED Talk speaker and host from a television show Best of Art Basel, distributed on Comcast, Ovation TV and Xfinity TV, and Claudia Hallowell who also wrote.

Summary
Spirit Love Show explores what love is to people of all ages: children, teenagers, adults and people who have been married for over half a century. The show features David Marciano, The Jeffrey Foundation, Reins of H.O.P.E. and others. Through interviews, the show will find what love means to individuals and couples in all walks of life as well as people of different cultures. In addition, the show will showcase what individuals, couples, groups and companies are doing to express love in the world to bring hope and inspiration.

Cast
Hosts
Nia Lyte - Host
Claudia Hallowell - Host

Featuring
David Marciano - an award winner actor from television series Due South and the FX police drama The Shield
International tourists at Grauman's Chinese Theatre in Hollywood
Julie Sardonia - a founder of Reins of H.O.P.E.
Alice Morris - a founder of The Jeffrey Foundation
John & Claire Yzaguirre - Marriage & Family Counselors
Therapy Dogs, Inc
Speed Dating
Oxnard Multicultural Festival
GBK Emmy's Gifting Suite

Episodes

References

External links
 
 

2010s American reality television series
English-language television shows
Dating and relationship reality television series